The Standard Interchange Language  is a data interchange language standard developed by the Food Distribution Retails Systems Group  for the interchange of information between software programs. It is a subset of SQL (Structured Query Language) and acts as an interface standard for transferring data between proprietary store systems like Direct Store Delivery  and Point of sale. It was introduced in 1989 in the United States.

References

External links 
 Expert: standard interchange language
 Supermarket industry develops common software protocol

Constructed languages introduced in the 1980s
1989 introductions
SQL
Data interchange standards